Hyde is the first mini-album by the South Korean boy band VIXX. It was released on May 20, 2013 under Jellyfish Entertainment, and features the single of the same name. The album was re-released as Jekyll on July 31, 2013 with the single "G.R.8.U".

Singles

"Hyde"
VIXX promoted Hyde with the song of the same name. The song's lyrics were written by songwriter Kim Eana, and the rap portion was written by Ravi. The music was composed by Jellyfish Entertainment CEO Hwang Se Jun and Swedish production team D30 (Caesar & Loui and Olof Lindskog). The song's music video was directed by Hong Won-ki of ZanyBros, who also directed their previous music videos, "Super Hero" and "Rock Ur Body".

Promotion began on May 23 on M! Countdown, and wrapped up with a goodbye stage on Inkigayo on June 30. The song peaked at number 35 on Gaon Singles Chart.

"G.R.8.U"
The lead single from Jekyll, "G.R.8.U", was written by Kim Eana and produced by Hyuk Shin, DK, Ross Lara and Todd Wright. The song's music video was directed by Hong Won-ki of ZanyBros. Promotion began on August 1, and wrapped up with a goodbye stage on Inkigayo on September 8. The song peaked at number 14 on Gaon Singles Chart.

Track listing
The credits are adapted from the official homepage of the group.

Awards and nominations

Chart performance

Album

Singles

Release history

See also
 List of K-pop albums on the Billboard charts

References

External links
 
 
 Hyde - EP on iTunes
 Jekyll - EP on iTunes

2013 EPs
VIXX albums
Korean-language EPs
Jellyfish Entertainment EPs
Stone Music Entertainment EPs
2013 debut EPs